Boyd Killingworth (born 6 April 1992) is a professional Rugby Union player. He completed his high school education at  The King's School, Parramatta in Sydney's north west. He represents Australia in Sevens Rugby. Born in Collaroy, NSW and playing for Warringah Rats at a club level, he debuted for Australia in December 2015. As of December 2019, he currently has 20 caps.

Boyd played every game for the North Harbour Rays in the 2015 National Rugby Championship. In Rugby Sevens, the Sydneysider also represented New South Wales in the National Sevens Championship in March 2015, helping his side win the title at the Sydney Academy of Sport in Narrabeen. Representative Honours include NSW 7s (2015), NRC North Harbour Rays (2014–15), National Academy (2011-2013), Waratahs A (2011) and the Australian Schoolboys (2010).

Super Rugby statistics

References

External links 
 

1992 births
Australian rugby union players
Male rugby sevens players
Australia international rugby sevens players
Living people
Rugby union flankers
Melbourne Rising players
Melbourne Rebels players
Sydney (NRC team) players